The Three Marys or The Three Marys and the Lord of Marana is a 1923 Austrian-German silent film directed by Reinhold Schünzel and starring Schünzel, Anita Berber and Lya De Putti.

The film's sets were designed by the art director Oscar Friedrich Werndorff.

Cast
 Reinhold Schünzel as Don Juan de la Marana
 Anita Berber
 Lya De Putti
 Olga Belajeff
 Hans Sieber
 Paul Kronegg
 Armin Springer
 Heinrich Eisenbach

References

Bibliography
 Bock, Hans-Michael & Bergfelder, Tim. The Concise CineGraph. Encyclopedia of German Cinema. Berghahn Books, 2009.

External links

1923 films
Films of the Weimar Republic
German silent feature films
Films directed by Reinhold Schünzel
Austrian silent films
German black-and-white films
1920s German films